The 1999 FIA GT Zolder 500 km was the fifth round the 1999 FIA GT Championship season.  It took place at the Circuit Zolder, Belgium, on July 18, 1999.

Official results
Cars failing to complete 70% of winner's distance are marked as Not Classified (NC).

Statistics
 Pole position – #25 Lister Storm Racing – 1:34.314
 Fastest lap – #25 Lister Storm Racing – 1:35.636
 Average speed – 147.598 km/h

References

 
 
 

Z
FIA GT Zolder
Auto races in Belgium